Staraya Kurba (Khuushan Khürbe) is a rural locality (a selo) in Zaigrayevsky District, Republic of Buryatia, Russia. The population was 549 as of 2010. There are 5 streets.

Geography 
Staraya Kurba is located 33 km northeast of Zaigrayevo (the district's administrative centre) by road. Novaya Kurba is the nearest rural locality.

References 

Rural localities in Zaigrayevsky District